Mark Twain Cave — originally McDowell's Cave — is a show cave located near Hannibal, Missouri. It was named for author Mark Twain whose real name was Samuel Langhorne Clemens. Clemens lived in Hannibal from 1839 to 1853, age 4 to 17. It is the oldest operating show cave in the state, giving tours continuously since 1886. Along with nearby Cameron Cave, it became a registered National Natural Landmark in 1972, with a citation reading "Exceptionally good examples of the maze type of cavern development." The cave — as "McDougal's Cave" — plays an important role in the novel The Adventures of Tom Sawyer (1876) by Mark Twain and was renamed in honor of the author in 1880.

Early history

Geology 
Geologically Mark Twain Cave and its nearby neighbor Cameron Cave differ from most of the 6,500+ caves found in Missouri. Both are believed to be remnants of a much larger cave system cut apart by a glacier and millions of years of erosion, leading to speculation by geologists and common citizens alike that there may be further undiscovered caves in the Hannibal region. This speculation was heightened in 2006 when the entrance to a previously unknown cave was found during construction of a new elementary school. A major difference is that Mark Twain Cave has a near total lack of speleothems, mineral deposits like stalagmites and stalactites in large open areas. Mark Twain Cave and Cameron Cave instead have a multitude of narrow, winding passages. The caves are made mostly of a soft limestone called Louisiana Lithographic Limestone that is found only in a  area around Hannibal and Louisiana, Missouri. The limestone has been estimated by geologists to be about 350 million years old, while the cave passages were formed some 100 million years ago.

Discovery and first uses 
While it is possible that prehistoric Native Americans were aware of the cave, the earliest documentation claims that Mark Twain Cave was discovered in the winter of 1819-1820 by a local hunter, Jack Simms, when his dog chased an animal into a small hillside opening south of current-day Hannibal. Upon investigation with torches, he and his brothers found that the small opening led to a large underground labyrinth. The cave proved a popular diversion for mid-19th century Hannibal residents, especially children, including the young Sam Clemens. These childhood explorations would later reappear in five of Mark Twain's books. The proximity to the Mississippi River and its cooling breezes made the small valley between the river bluffs containing the caves a popular site for family picnics and church outings in the summertime.

The "mad" scientist and the outlaw 
Pioneering Hannibal physician Dr. Joseph Nash McDowell purchased the cave in the late 1840s and used it for several years as a laboratory for medical research on human corpses. His belief that traditional burial 'stifled the soul of the dead', and a different type of interment would aid communication between living and dead, led to one of the cave's more notorious episodes, and inspiration for Twain, when McDowell placed his recently deceased child Amanda in a preserving coffin inside the cave work space. Twain's book Life on the Mississippi offered a description of the activities:
In my time the person who owned it [the cave] turned it into a mausoleum for his daughter, age fourteen. The body of this poor child was put in a copper cylinder filled with alcohol, and this suspended in one of the dismal avenues of the cave.

However in 1849, when McDowell learned that locals had been daring each other to break into the cave and open the cylinder, disrespecting his child’s remains, he had the body removed for a more traditional, and safer, burial in the family vault behind the newly-built Missouri Medical College where he worked. A fable of the body being forcibly removed by angry Hannibal citizens, having heard of it from the children who had used the body to enhance their telling of ghost stories, was added to the rumors that swirled around McDowell. Many in St. Louis believed that McDowell also used bodies stolen from local graves for his medical examinations, a not uncommon practice prior to the 20th century. Twain would weave that suspicion into the plot of Tom Sawyer in a grave robbing scene involving Injun Joe.

According to folklore, McDowell used the cave as a secret Confederate weapons storage cache during the American Civil War. McDowell was an ardent Southern supporter, and indeed had a stash of cannons and muskets, previously intended to aid the rebels in his home state of Kentucky in 1846, stockpiled at his St. Louis medical college, as evidenced when an angry mob gathered outside the building, mistakenly accusing McDowell of murder. One of the former Confederates who likely had knowledge of the cave from his war service is the legendary outlaw Jesse James. James had ridden with Quantrill's Raiders and Bloody Bill Anderson throughout the Little Dixie area southwest of Hannibal. In September 1879, following the robbery of a train in nearby Saverton, Missouri, the cave proved a ready and secure hideout for few days rest. James even signed and dated one of the caves walls using a pencil. That section of the cave used to be open to tours but has since been excluded from the tour as the pencil marks have faded.

Advent of tourism

The cave was little known outside of the immediate Hannibal region until 1876, when Twain's landmark novel The Adventures of Tom Sawyer was published. Soon tourists worldwide were making the journey to see the real-life cave that provided the basis for the novel's fictional "MacDougal's Cave", where Tom and Becky Thatcher's lives were endangered by Injun Joe. The first regular tours by paying customers began in 1886 when local farmer John East charged tourists a dime to see some of the places inside the cave made famous by the novel. East excavated an entrance for these tours, but found it was difficult to enter through it. In 1890, a new entry to the cave was created nearby.

For over fifty years tourists saw the cave much as Twain had in his youth, by candlelight or lantern. That changed in 1939 when electric lights were added to the tour areas of the cave by the Cameron family. The cave had been purchased in 1923 by Judge E.T. Cameron, who had been a guide at the cave as a young man. Through a succession of owners in the late 1800s and early 1900s, Cameron had served as manager of the cave property. He was the first to establish standardized tour routes within the cave, construct a small building near the entrance for ticket sales, and advertise the cave in newspapers as "Mark Twain Cave".

Discovery of Cameron Cave 
One cold winter day in 1925, Judge Cameron's son Archie was caring for the family's cattle herd when he noticed steam rising from a sinkhole in the ground across the valley from Mark Twain Cave. After some digging, he discovered a large natural underground room. Further exploration found a cave even larger than Mark Twain Cave, with more twisted pathways. This "sister" cave was named for the Cameron family. Tours of Cameron Cave are offered, but are of a more primitive nature. The cave has no electric lights, and the only modifications made have been those mandated by law for safety.

Current status
The entire cave complex is privately owned by Todd and Austin Curry, who purchased the complex in 2020. It had previously been owned by the Coleberd family, descendants of Judge Cameron. The complex includes the Mark Twain and Cameron caves, a campground, a gift shop/visitors center, a candle shop, and a winery. Other available activities include The Life and Times of Mark Twain, a one-man stage performance that covers various highlights and the humor of the author's life from a first-person perspective. One of the newest additions to the cave complex is Sticks & Stones, an interactive gem shop where children and adults can sluice for semi-precious stones, much like Twain did in his brief gold panning career. One of the most notable visitors was U.S. President Jimmy Carter, who toured Mark Twain Cave with his family in 1979. The guided tour of Mark Twain Cave takes approximately 55 minutes, while the larger Cameron Cave tour averages one hour twenty minutes in length. Mark Twain Cave is open year-around except Thanksgiving and Christmas days. Cameron Cave is open from Memorial Day through Labor Day only.

Discovery of Clemens signature
For decades, cave owners, scholars, and visitors searched for the signature of Sam Clemens among the 250,000 signatures visitors had written on the walls of the cave in candle smoke, pencil, paint, and even berry juice. On July 26, 2019, Cindy Lovell, former director of both the Mark Twain Boyhood Home & Museum in Hannibal and the Mark Twain House in Hartford, Connecticut, discovered "Clemens" written on the cave wall during a special tour for Twain scholars. She and owner Linda Coleberd had been searching for the signature for decades. Twain scholars Alan Gribben and Kevin Mac Donnell authenticated the signature.

References

Show caves in the United States
Caves of Missouri
Limestone caves
National Natural Landmarks in Missouri
Roadside attractions in Missouri
Landforms of Ralls County, Missouri
Hannibal, Missouri micropolitan area
Quincy–Hannibal area
Mark Twain
Tourist attractions in Ralls County, Missouri